The Piano Quintet in G minor, Op. 57 by Dmitri Shostakovich  is one of his best-known chamber works. Like most piano quintets, it is written for piano and string quartet (two violins, viola and cello).

Shostakovich began work on the piece in the summer of 1940 and completed it on September 14. It was written for the Beethoven Quartet, as were most of his string quartets, and premiered by them with Shostakovich himself at the piano on November 23, 1940 at the Moscow Conservatory, to great success. In 1941, it was awarded the Stalin Prize.

A typical performance of the quintet runs slightly more than 30 minutes.

Structure
The quintet is in five movements:

References

External links
Classical Net Review
Boosey and Hawkes page
1947 recording with D. Shostakovich and the Beethoven Quartet

Chamber music by Dmitri Shostakovich
Shostakovich
1940 compositions
Compositions in G minor